Ardingly Reservoir is west of Ardingly in West Sussex. The southern end is a  Local Nature Reserve owned and managed by South East Water.

The villages of Ardingly and Balcombe are immediately to the east and north of the reservoir respectively. It was created in 1978 by damming Shell Brook, a tributary of the River Ouse which flows into the Ouse about 500m south of the reservoir. It is filled with water pumped from the River Ouse when river flows are high. The water is stored in the reservoir before being treated and distributed to consumers.

The Ardingly Activity Centre provides watersports for the public including wind surfing, kayaking, powerboating, paddle boarding and dinghy sailing.  The reservoir is also used by Ardingly Rowing Club.

The west bank of the reservoir is private property of the Balcombe Estate but the north, south and east shores offer public rights of way and bridleways. Ornithologists are catered for with two bird hides situated on the east bank.

References

Reservoirs in West Sussex
Drinking water reservoirs in England
Local Nature Reserves in West Sussex
Ardingly